The Independent Spirit Award for Best Female Performance in a New Scripted Series was one of the annual Independent Spirit Awards to honor an actress who has delivered an outstanding performance in a new scripted series. It was first presented in 2020 with Shira Haas being the first recipient of the award for her role as Esther "Esty" Shapiro in miniseries Unorthodox and the last recipient of the award is Thuso Mbedu for her role as Cora Randall in The Underground Railroad. 

In 2022, it was announced that the acting categories would be retired and replaced with two gender neutral categories: Best Lead Performance in a New Scripted Series & Best Supporting Performance in a New Scripted Series.

Winners and nominees

2020s

References

Best New Scripted Film
American television awards
Awards established in 2020